The Lorentz oscillator model describes the optical response of bound charges. The model is named after the Dutch physicist Hendrik Antoon Lorentz. It is a classical, phenomenological model for materials with characteristic resonance frequencies (or other characteristic energy scales) for optical absorption, e.g. ionic and molecular vibrations, interband transitions (semiconductors), phonons, and collective excitations.

Derivation of electron motion  
The model is derived by modeling an electron orbiting a massive, stationary nucleus as a spring-mass-damper system. The electron is modeled to be connected to the nucleus via a hypothetical spring and its motion is damped by via a hypothetical damper. The damping force ensures that the oscillator's response is finite at its resonance frequency. For a time-harmonic driving force which originates from the electric field, Newton’s second law can be applied to the electron to obtain the motion of the electron and expressions for the dipole moment, polarization, susceptibility, and dielectric function.

Equation of motion for electron oscillator:

where
  is the displacement of charge from the rest position,
  is time,
  is the relaxation time/scattering time,
  is a constant factor characteristic of the spring,
  is the effective mass of the electron,
 
  is the resonance frequency of the oscillator,
  is the elementary charge,
  is the electric field.

For time-harmonic fields:

The stationary solution of this equation of motion is:

The fact that the above solution is complex means there is a time delay (phase shift) between the driving electric field and the response of the electron’s motion.

Dipole moment 
The displacement, induces a dipole moment, given by

 is the polarizability of single oscillator, given by

Polarization 
The polarization  is the dipole moment per unit volume. For macroscopic material properties N is the density of charges (electrons) per unit volume. Considering that each electron is acting with the same dipole moment we have the polarization as below

Electric displacement 
The electric displacement  is related to the polarization density  by

Dielectric function 

The complex dielectric function is given by

In practice, the model is commonly modified to account for multiple absorption mechanisms present in a medium. The modified version is given by

where

and 
  is the value of the dielectric function at infinite frequency, which can be used as an adjustable parameter to account for high frequency absorption mechanisms, 
 .

Separating the real and imaginary components,

Complex conductivity
The complex optical conductivity in general is related to the complex dielectric function

Separating the real and imaginary components,

References

See also 
 Cauchy equation
 Sellmeier equation
 Forouhi–Bloomer model
 Tauc–Lorentz model
 Brendel–Bormann oscillator model

Condensed matter physics
Electric and magnetic fields in matter
Optics